Dibo, a.k.a. Ganagana, Ganagawa, Zhitako, is a Nupoid language spoken in Nigeria. It is spoken in about twenty villages south of Lapai. There is only 66% cognacy with Central Nupe, out of 200 words.

References

Nupoid languages